Novokhasanovo (Yañı Xäsän) is a rural locality (a selo) in Inzersky Selsoviet, Beloretsky District, Bashkortostan, Russia. The population was 177 as of 2010. There are 3 streets.

Geography 
Novokhasanovo is located 94 km northwest of Beloretsk (the district's administrative centre) by road. Inzer is the nearest rural locality.

References 

Rural localities in Beloretsky District